Christie Barlow is a British author of women's fiction.

Education
Barlow grew up in Northwich, Cheshire where she attended Weaverham High School and Sir John Deane's College.

Work
Barlow self-published her first novel A Year in the Life of a Playground Mother in June 2014. This reached number one in the UK and USA on the Amazon Kindle chart.

In 2015, she secured a publishing contract with publisher Bookouture to republish her two existing titles and three new books. In 2016, she secured a contract with HarperCollins.

She is an ambassador for the charity The Zuri Project Uganda.

Personal life 
Barlow lives in Staffordshire with her four children whom she credits as her inspiration.

Bibliography
 A Year in the Life of a Playground Mother (2014)
 The Misadventures of a Playground Mother (2015)
 Kitty's Countryside Dream (2016)
 Lizzie's Christmas Escape (2016)
 Evie's Year of Taking Chances (2017)
 The Cosy Canal Boat Dream (2017)
 A Home at Honeysuckle Farm (2018)

References 

Living people
People educated at Sir John Deane's College
British women novelists
British women writers
British romantic fiction writers
Year of birth missing (living people)